The , full name , is a red list of threatened breeds of domestic animal published annually by the Gesellschaft zur Erhaltung alter und gefährdeter Haustierrassen, the German national association for the conservation of historic and endangered domestic animal breeds.

History

The GEH was founded in Witzenhausen, in Hesse, central Germany, in 1981. In 1987 it established the criteria on which the Rote Liste is based. The list is published annually, and attributes one of four categories of conservation risk to domestic breeds of cattle, dogs, goats, horses, pigs, rabbits and sheep, of chickens, ducks, geese and turkeys, and of bees; listing of domestic pigeon breeds is in preparation. Some breeds from outside Germany are listed separately. The four levels of risk are:

 I: , extremely endangered
 II: , seriously endangered
 III: , endangered
 , alert

The risk level is calculated using a formula that takes into account five criteria: the number of breeding animals or breeding females; the percentage of pure-bred matings; the five-year trend in breed numbers; the number of breeders or herds; and the interval between generations of the animal.

The same levels of conservation risk are assigned as in the main red list.

Endangered breeds

In 2014 the breeds listed were:

Note

See also

Rare breed (agriculture)
IUCN Red List

References

Agriculture in Germany
Biodiversity
Lists of animals by conservation status
Sustainable agriculture
Rare breed conservation